Johan Philip "Pilou" Asbæk (born 2 March 1982) is a Danish actor. He is known for his role as troubled spin doctor Kasper Juul in the Danish television political drama Borgen, and as Euron Greyjoy in the television series Game of Thrones.

Early life 
Asbæk was born in Copenhagen, the son of gallery owners Maria Patricia (née Tonn) and Jacob A. Asbæk, who run Galerie Asbæk in Copenhagen. His mother was born in Casablanca, Morocco, to a Danish father and a French mother. His father is from Hammel. He has two older brothers, Thomas Asbæk, an art consultant at Asbæk Art Consulting, and Martin Asbæk, a gallery owner at Martin Asbæk Gallery.

Asbæk went to boarding school at Herlufsholm School, where he was active in drama productions. He graduated from Denmark's Danish National School of Performing Arts in the summer of 2008.

Career

Television 
In 2009, Asbæk played soldier David Grüner in an episode of the second season of the Danish TV series The Killing (Danish: Forbrydelsen).

From 2010 to 2013, Asbæk played spin-doctor Kasper Juul in the critically lauded Danish TV series Borgen, written by Tobias Lindholm, about the politics of a female prime minister of Denmark. Asbæk's performance was uniformly praised by critics. In 2014, the Danish public-funded DR cast Asbæk as Didrich, a landowner suffering from post-traumatic stress disorder, in a big-budget period TV series called 1864.

In 2016, Asbæk joined the HBO series Game of Thrones in Season 6 as Euron Greyjoy.

Film 
In 2011, Asbæk starred in another piece by Tobias Lindholm, in the film R, as a Danish convict, portraying a harrowing prison experience. The film was shot in the Dogme 95–inspired style. The next year, in 2012, Asbæk starred in another Tobias Lindholm film called A Hijacking, about Somalian piracy, for which he transformed himself physically, gaining weight to imbue the role with method acting.

In 2013, Asbæk portrayed a flamboyant Danish tycoon named Simon Spies in the movie Sex, Drugs & Taxation (Danish: Spies & Glistrup). In this film, Asbæk co-stars opposite his wife's cousin, the actor Nicolas Bro, who plays the other main character, Mogens Glistrup.

In 2014, Asbæk starred opposite Scarlett Johansson in the Luc Besson film Lucy. Also in 2014, Asbæk appeared in the Bille August film Silent Heart (Danish: Stille Hjerte), in which his mother-in-law, Danish actress Vigga Bro, plays the character Lisbeth.

In 2015, Asbæk again collaborated with director Tobias Lindholm in the film A War (Danish: Krigen), playing a soldier in Afghanistan. The film premiered at the Venice Film Festival.

Asbæk co-starred in the 2016 remake of Ben-Hur, starring Jack Huston and Morgan Freeman. He portrayed Pontius Pilate.

In 2017, he played Batou in Ghost in the Shell.

In 2018, he played Captain Wafner in Overlord.

Asbaek plays the lead role as police investigator Anders Olsen in Murderous Trance, opposite Josh Lucas. Written and directed by Arto Halonen, the movie is based on actual events. The plot revolves around the bizarre case of the hypnosis murders, which took place in Copenhagen in 1951.

In April 2021, he joined the cast of the upcoming superhero film Aquaman and the Lost Kingdom in an undisclosed role.

In September 2021, Asbaek joined the cast of the Stephen King adaptation of Salem's Lot as Richard Straker.

Theater 
 2008: Folk og røvere i Kardemomme By – Bellevue Teatret
 2008: Core – Det Lille Gasværk.

Presenting 
On 10 May 2014, Asbæk co-hosted the Eurovision Song Contest 2014 in Copenhagen, with Lise Rønne and Nikolaj Koppel. Some critics commented adversely on the obscure jokes shared by the presenters throughout the televised show.

Personal life 
Asbæk's wife is playwright Anna Bro, who had been his domestic partner since 2008. They have a daughter Agnes Bro Asbæk, born 31 December 2012. Anna is the daughter of the actors Hans Henrik Clemensen and Vigga Bro and comes from an extended family of actors. 

The nickname Pilou came from his mother's French ancestry and is a French version of the word "Pip." The nickname is because Asbæk was the youngest son, in French, "le plus petit" for littlest, "Little Philip." Pilou is an abbreviation of Petit Philip.

Asbæk's godfather was the late artist Kurt Trampedach.

After having criticised what he considered too harsh refugee policies by the Danish government led by Social Democratic prime minister Mette Frederiksen, Asbæk joined the Danish Social Democratic Party in January 2022 to "speak up against it from within".

Awards 
 2010: Danish Film Academy – Robert Award for Best Actor in a Leading Role for R
 2010: Danish Film Critics Association's Bodil Awards – Bodil Award for Best Actor in a Leading Role for R
 2011: Berlin International Film Festival – Shooting Stars Award
 2012: Ove Sprogøe Prize.

Filmography

Film

Television

References

External links 

 
 Pilou Asbæk at Danish Film Institute
 

1982 births
Living people
21st-century Danish male actors
Best Actor Bodil Award winners
Danish male film actors
Danish people of French descent
Danish male television actors
Male actors from Copenhagen
People educated at Herlufsholm School